Charles Workman may refer to:

 (born 1965), American opera singer
Charles H. Workman (1872–1923), English singer and actor
Charles Workman (mobster) (1908–1979), hitman who killed Dutch Schultz